The Big Arm School is a site on the National Register of Historic Places located northwest of Polson, Montana.  It was added to the Register on August 16, 2007.

It is a one-story, wood-frame,  school building which also served as a dance hall and a polling station and in other functions.  It was built in the mid-1910s and served both Indian and non-Indian students for fifty years.  Its first teacher was a Mr. Howe; another named M.P. Elder taught 33 students from 15 families in 1915–16.  During 1944-45 there were just five students, taught by Marie Twitchel, including her brother.

References

School buildings on the National Register of Historic Places in Montana
1910s establishments in Montana
National Register of Historic Places in Lake County, Montana
School buildings completed in 1915
Education in Lake County, Montana